Regional elections were held in France on 6 and 13 December 2015. At stake were the regional councils in metropolitan and overseas France including the Corsican Assembly and inaugural seats in the Assembly of French Guiana and Assembly of Martinique, all for a six-year term. The Departmental Council of Mayotte, which also exercises the powers of a region, was the only region not participating in this election, having already been renewed on 2 April 2015. There were 18 regional presidencies at stake, with 13 in mainland France and Corsica, as well as 5 overseas. Though they do not have legislative autonomy, these territorial collectivities manage sizable budgets. Moreover, regional elections are often taken as a mid-term opinion poll.

These elections were the first to be held for the redrawn regions: the 27 regions of France were amalgamated into 18, this went into effect on 1 January 2016.

Voting system

The regional elections are held in direct universal suffrage using proportional representation lists. The election is held over two rounds, with majority bonus. The lists must be gender balanced by alternatively have a male candidate and a female candidate from the top to the bottom of the list. Only lists with as many candidates as available seats in every departement of the region may compete. Before 2004, lists could be presented only at the departement level, allowing smaller parties (e.g. Hunting, Fishing, Nature, Tradition, Alsace d'abord, Lutte Ouvrière, Revolutionary Communist League) to be represented as such in the regional councils and thus forcing major parties to enter into negotiations to rule some regions.

Following the 1999 and 2003 electoral reforms, with a first implementation in 2004, a two-round runoff voting system is used to elect the regional presidents. If no party gets at least 50% of the vote in the first round, a second round is held, which any party who got at least 10% in the first round may enter. Lists that obtain at least 5% of the vote in the first round may merge in the second round with a 'qualified list', which includes candidates from each merged list.

At the decisive round (first round if a list won 50%, the second round if not), the leading list receives a premium of 25% of the seats while the remaining seats are distributed among all lists who received at least 5% of votes. Thus, the majority bonus allows a leading list to have an absolute majority of seats in the Regional Council from one-third of votes in the second round. The seats are distributed among the lists at the regional level but within each list, seats are allocated by departement branch in proportion to the number of votes in each department.

Opinion polls

National results

France uses a two-round runoff system to elect the regional presidencies, and as such not all seats contested will see a candidate elected in the first round.

First round
The first round election was held on 6 December 2015.

Second round
Runoff elections were held on 13 December 2015 in regions where no candidate was able to win outright in the first round.

After the first round, the Socialist Party withdrew its lists in the regions of Provence-Alpes-Côte d'Azur and Hauts-de-France, where they finished in third place, in an attempt to block the Front National from winning seats in the second round due to split opposition from the centre-left and centre-right blocs. However, despite instructions from the party, the Socialist candidate chose to maintain his list in the region of Le Grand-Est, which similarly had them in third and the FN with a sizable lead after the first round.

The result was a disappointment for the Front National, which was unable to win any of the regional presidencies in the face of concerted tactical voting. However, in both the north and the south, they managed to increase their share of the vote from the first round. Of the 12 regions in mainland France, 7 were won by the Republicans and 5 were retained by the Socialists.

By region

The following table shows regional presidents before and after the elections, with merged regions shown alongside the region taking effect in 2016. The candidates on the left were the incumbents, whereas the candidates on the right were those elected (or re-elected) to the new regions. In the case of Corsica and Martinique, multiple presidencies were at stake.

The following table shows each major party's performance by region. The bolded candidates received the most votes, and were thus elected president of their respective regions.

References

External links 
 Full results

2015
2015 elections in France